Anna Stera-Kustusz (born 14 November 1974 in Duszniki-Zdrój) - Polish biathlete. Her biggest achievement was taking third place in Biathlon World Championships 1993 in team-contest together with Zofia Kiełpińska, Krystyna Liberda and Helena Mikołajczyk.

Achievements

Biathlon at the Winter Olympics 

IN – individual run, SP – sprint, PU – individual pursuit, MS – mass-run, RL – relay run

Biathlon World Championships

Places of World Championships' podium

Bibliography
 Sports-reference.com - Anna Stera-Kustucz

1974 births
Living people
People from Duszniki-Zdrój
Polish female biathletes
Olympic biathletes of Poland
Biathletes at the 1994 Winter Olympics
Biathletes at the 1998 Winter Olympics
Biathletes at the 2002 Winter Olympics